The 1974–75 Soviet Championship League season was the 29th season of the Soviet Championship League, the top level of ice hockey in the Soviet Union. Ten teams participated in the league, and CSKA Moscow won the championship.

Regular season

Relegation 
 Avtomobilist Sverdlovsk – SKA Leningrad 0:2, 2:6

External links
Season on hockeystars.ru

1974–75 in Soviet ice hockey
Soviet League seasons
Sov